Oldham Metrolink station may refer to:

Metrolink tram stops

Oldham Mumps tram stop, a station on Greater Manchester's Metrolink system which opened in 2014
Oldham Central tram stop
Oldham King Street tram stop
Westwood tram stop

Historic railway stations

Oldham Central railway station
Oldham Werneth railway station
Clegg Street railway station
Glodwick Road railway station